Stefano Minelli (born 5 March 1994) is an Italian footballer who plays as a goalkeeper for  club Südtirol on loan from Cesena.

Club career 
Minelli was a youth player with Brescia Calcio. He made his debut on 25 May 2014 against Juve Stabia in a Serie B game. He played the full game in a 4-1 home win.

On 4 September 2019, he joined Padova.

On 11 December 2020, he signed as a free-agent with SPAL.

On 30 January 2021, he moved to Perugia.

On 10 September 2021, he joined Frosinone on a one-year contract.

On 14 July 2022, Minelli signed a two-year deal with Cesena. On 13 January 2023, he moved on loan to Südtirol until the end of the season.

References

External links
 
 

1994 births
Footballers from Brescia
Living people
Italian footballers
Association football goalkeepers
Brescia Calcio players
Calcio Padova players
S.P.A.L. players
A.C. Perugia Calcio players
Frosinone Calcio players
Cesena F.C. players
F.C. Südtirol players
Serie B players
Serie C players